Thomas Sheehan (born 1966) is an Irish retired Gaelic footballer who played as a left wing-forward for the Tipperary senior team.

Born in Fethard, County Tipperary, Sheehan first arrived on the inter-county scene at the age of sixteen when he first linked up with the Tipperary minor team before later joining the under-21 and junior sides. Sheehan joined the senior panel during the 1987 championship.

At club level Sheehan won several championship medals with Fethard.

He retired from inter-county football following the conclusion of the 1989 championship.

In retirement from playing Sheehan became involved in team management and coaching, most notably as a selector with the Tipperary minor team.

Honours

Player

Tipperary
McGrath Cup (1): 1989
Munster Minor Football Championship (1): 1984
Munster Junior Football 1998
All Ireland Junior Football 1998
County Senior Football Titles (6) 1984,1988,1991,1993,1997,2001,

References

1966 births
Living people
Fethard Gaelic footballers
Tipperary inter-county Gaelic footballers
Gaelic football selectors